Stanley Jerome Pritchett (born December 22, 1973) is a former professional American football player. A 6'1", 245-lb. fullback from the University of South Carolina, Pritchett was selected by the Miami Dolphins in the fourth round of the 1996 NFL Draft with the 118th overall pick. He played nine seasons in the National Football League (NFL) from 1996 to 2004 for the Dolphins, the Philadelphia Eagles, the Chicago Bears and the Atlanta Falcons. Pritchett is a member of Kappa Alpha Psi fraternity.  Pritchett, whose father, Dr. Stanley Pritchett, is the acting president at Morris Brown College, and is a high school professor and a head football coach at Douglass High School .

External links
Stanley Pritchett at pro-football-reference.com
Former Falcons RB focuses on career as educator

Players of American football from Atlanta
American football fullbacks
South Carolina Gamecocks football players
Miami Dolphins players
Philadelphia Eagles players
Chicago Bears players
Atlanta Falcons players
1973 births
Living people